Calan may refer to

 Calan (band), a Welsh band
 Calan, Morbihan, a town in Brittany, France
 Calan, a trade name for the drug Verapamil
 Călan, a town in Hunedoara County, Romania
 Alline Calandrini (born 1988), known as Calan, a Brazilian footballer